The Brooklawn Public School District is a community public school district that serves public school students in pre-kindergarten through eighth grade from Brooklawn, in Camden County, New Jersey, United States.

As of the 2020–21 school year, the district, comprised of one school, had an enrollment of 286 students and 29.4 classroom teachers (on an FTE basis), for a student–teacher ratio of 9.7:1.

The district participates in the Interdistrict Public School Choice Program at Alice Costello School, having been approved in July 2001 to participate in the program. Seats in the program for non-resident students are specified by the district and are allocated by lottery, with tuition paid for participating students by the New Jersey Department of Education.

The district is classified by the New Jersey Department of Education as being in District Factor Group "B", the second lowest of eight groupings. District Factor Groups organize districts statewide to allow comparison by common socioeconomic characteristics of the local districts. From lowest socioeconomic status to highest, the categories are A, B, CD, DE, FG, GH, I and J.

For ninth through twelfth grades, public school students attend Gloucester City Junior-Senior High School in Gloucester City as part of a sending/receiving relationship with the Gloucester City Public Schools. As of the 2020–21 school year, the high school had an enrollment of 587 students and 46.5 classroom teachers (on an FTE basis), for a student–teacher ratio of 12.6:1.

Schools
Alice Costello School serves students in grades PreK-8. The school had an enrollment of 285 students as of the 2020–21 school year.
Samuel A. Rosetti, Principal
Leatrice Johnson, Assistant Principal

Administration
Core members of the district's administration are:
Samuel A. Rosetti, Superintendent
Sam Dutkin, Business Administrator / Board Secretary

Board of education
The district's board of education is comprised of nine members who set policy and oversee the fiscal and educational operation of the district through its administration. As a Type II school district, the board's trustees are elected directly by voters to serve three-year terms of office on a staggered basis, with three seats up for election each year held (since 2012) as part of the November general election. The board appoints a superintendent to oversee the district's day-to-day operations and a business administrator to supervise the business functions of the district.

References

External links
Brooklawn Public School District

School Data for the Brooklawn Public School District, National Center for Education Statistics

Brooklawn, New Jersey
New Jersey District Factor Group B
School districts in Camden County, New Jersey